Guda may refer to:

People
 Daniel Guda (born 1996), Australian badminton player
 Guda (nun), 12th-century nun and illuminator
 Guda Anjaiah (1955–2016), Indian author
 Idi Othman Guda (1941–2015), Nigerian politician
 Trudi Guda (born 1940), Surinamese poet and anthropologist

Places
 Gudå, Norway

Other
 Guda or tulum (bagpipe)